Gerard Collins (born 1957) is a Canadian painter.

Early life and education
Collins was born in Saint John, New Brunswick. He studied initially at St. Martin’s School of Art in London, England, ultimately completing a BFA degree at the Nova Scotia College of Art and Design. He later studied under Gerhard Richter at the Staaliche Kunstakademie in Dusseldorf, Germany.

Career
In 2001 Collins received the Strathbutler Award for New Brunswick artists. Collins' work is held in the collections of the National Gallery of Canada, The Art Gallery of Nova Scotia and the New Brunswick Museum.

References

1957 births
20th-century Canadian painters
Canadian male painters
21st-century Canadian painters
Artists from Saint John, New Brunswick
Living people
20th-century Canadian male artists
21st-century Canadian male artists